Quentin Sims (born July 11, 1990) is an American football wide receiver who is currently a free agent. He played college football at University of Tennessee at Martin and attended Northwest High School and Colerain High School in Cincinnati, Ohio where he played football and participated in track and field. He has also been a member of the New England Patriots, Orlando Predators, Winnipeg Blue Bombers, Arizona Rattlers, Cleveland Gladiators,  Ottawa Redblacks and Baltimore Brigade.

College career
Sims played for the Georgia Tech Yellow Jackets from 2008 to 2010. He was the team's back up wide receiver for 2 years and helped the Yellow Jackets to 16 wins. He transferred to UT Martin where he played from 2011 to 2012. He was the team's starter for two years and helped the Skyhawks to 13 wins. He played in 45 games during his career including 22 starts at wide receiver. As a senior in 2012, Sims was named First-team All-Ohio Valley Conference.

Statistics
Sims's college statistics are as follows:

Professional career

New England Patriots
Sims signed as an undrafted free agent with the New England Patriots on July 19, 2013. He played in all four of the Patriots preseason games before he was cut on August 31, 2013. On September 2, 2013, Sims was signed to the Patriots practice squad. He was cut on September 10, 2013.

Orlando Predators
Sims was assigned to the Orlando Predators in 2013. Sims was activated from other league exempt status on May 12, 2014. However, he was placed on the refused to report list on May 13. He was placed on reassignment on June 6, 2014.

Winnipeg Blue Bombers
Sims signed with the Winnipeg Blue Bombers on February 5, 2014. He was cut on May 1, 2014.

Arizona Rattlers
Sims was assigned to the Arizona Rattlers on June 24, 2015. Sims was activated On June 6, 2015, and appeared in the Rattlers final game of the season scoring two touchdowns. He played in the Rattlers National Conference Semifinals but did not play in the National Conference Championship loss to the San Jose SaberCats. On October 12, 2015, the Rattlers picked up Sims' rookie option, but on November 5, 2015, Sims was placed on recallable reassignment.

Cleveland Gladiators
On February 5, 2016, Sims was assigned to the Cleveland Gladiators. Sims recorded career highs in all statistical categories in 2016 with 92 receptions, 1,112 receiving yards and 27 touchdowns. Sims emerged as the Gladiators number one receiver in 2017 and earned Second-team All-Arena honors.

Ottawa Redblacks
Sims was signed to the Ottawa Redblacks' practice roster on September 6, 2017. He was released by the Redblacks on September 12, 2017.

Baltimore Brigade
On March 22, 2018, Sims was assigned to the Baltimore Brigade.

Albany Empire
On March 11, 2019, Sims was assigned to the Albany Empire.

References

External links
Georgia Tech Yellow Jackets profile

Living people
1990 births
Players of American football from Ohio
American football wide receivers
Canadian football wide receivers
American players of Canadian football
Georgia Tech Yellow Jackets football players
UT Martin Skyhawks football players
New England Patriots players
Orlando Predators players
Arizona Rattlers players
Cleveland Gladiators players
Winnipeg Blue Bombers players
Ottawa Redblacks players
Baltimore Brigade players
Albany Empire (AFL) players